Nguyễn Trung Hiếu (born 21 September 1979) is a Vietnamese sports shooter. He competed in the men's 25 metre rapid fire pistol event at the 2000 Summer Olympics.

References

External links
 

1979 births
Living people
Vietnamese male sport shooters
Olympic shooters of Vietnam
Shooters at the 2000 Summer Olympics
Place of birth missing (living people)
Shooters at the 1998 Asian Games
Shooters at the 2002 Asian Games
Asian Games competitors for Vietnam
20th-century Vietnamese people